Chondropoma irradians is a species of an operculate land snail, terrestrial gastropod mollusk in the family Pomatiidae.

Distribution 
This species lives in Cuba.

Ecology 
Chondropoma irradians is a ground dwelling and rock dwelling species.

Predators of Chondropoma irradians include larvae of firefly bug Alecton discoidalis.

References

Pomatiidae
Gastropods described in 1852
Endemic fauna of Cuba